Sabella or The Blood Stone is a novel by British writer Tanith Lee, first  published in 1980.

Plot summary
Sabella or The Blood Stone is a novel in which a lady vampire is on colonized Mars.

Reception
Dave Langford reviewed Sabella or The Blood Stone for White Dwarf #100, and stated that "The lurid fantasy and SF images mix well, like shaken oil and vinegar, but Lee eventually takes it too far by introducing a dubious SF rationale for the vampire theme [...] High marks nevertheless."

Reviews
Review by Susan M. Shwartz (1980) in Science Fiction Review, August 1980
Review by Tom Easton (1980) in Analog Science Fiction/Science Fact, November 1980
Review by Elizabeth Stanford (1980) in Thrust, #15, Summer 1980
Review by Lee Montgomerie (1988) in Interzone, #23 Spring 1988

References

1980 science fiction novels
Novels set on Mars
Vampire novels